Handy is an unincorporated community in the northwest corner of Ripley County, in the U.S. state of Missouri.

History
A post office called Handy was established in 1913, and remained in operation until 1954. The community's name most likely is derived from the last name of Noah Haney, a local merchant. A folk etymology maintains the townspeople wrote to postal officials requesting a post office, adding "it sure would be handy".

References

Unincorporated communities in Ripley County, Missouri
Unincorporated communities in Missouri